Arnaud McKellar (17 November 1891 – 28 April 1968) was a New Zealand cricketer. He played in one first-class match for Wellington in 1919/20.

See also
 List of Wellington representative cricketers

References

External links
 

1891 births
1968 deaths
New Zealand cricketers
Wellington cricketers
Cricketers from Auckland